The 1982 Arizona Wildcats football team represented the University of Arizona in the Pacific-10 Conference (Pac-10) during the 1982 NCAA Division I-A football season.  In their third season under head coach Larry Smith, the Wildcats compiled a 6–4–1 record (4–3–1 against Pac-10 opponents), finished in fifth place in the Pac-10, and outscored their opponents, 311 to 219.  The team played its home games in Arizona Stadium in Tucson, Arizona. Despite a winning record, the Wildcats did not appear in a bowl game, as they self-imposed a postseason ban due to NCAA violations prior to Smith becoming coach in 1980 (see below).

Memorable highlights of the season included a big road win at Notre Dame and a huge upset of rival Arizona State which denied ASU a chance to potentially play in the Rose Bowl.

The team's statistical leaders included Tom Tunnicliffe with 2,520 passing yards, Vance Johnson with 443 rushing yards, and Brad Anderson with 870 receiving yards. Linebacker Ricky Hunley led the team with 173 total tackles.

Before the season
Arizona completed the 1981 season with a 6–5 record, highlighted by a huge road upset victory over USC. The Wildcats entered 1982 with high hopes that they were contenders for the Pac-10 title, with fans crediting Smith for rebuilding the program.

However, despite Smith rebuilding the team, the Wildcats have been embroiled in a scandal that happened in the late 1970s under Smith’s predecessor Tony Mason. Both the NCAA and the Pac-10 investigated and determined that Arizona operated a slush fund which involved Mason that paid players cash, which turned out to be fraudulent, and the Wildcats were put on probation as a result. As NCAA sanctions were soon to be handed out, Arizona decided to self-impose a postseason ban for the 1982 season as punishment, which meant that they would become ineligible for the Pac-10 title and Rose Bowl appearance. The NCAA would eventually ban the Wildcats from bowl games in 1983 and 1984, respectively.

Personnel

Schedule

Game summaries

Iowa

    
    
    
    
    

Arizona faced Iowa at home. The Wildcats defeated the Hawkeyes on the road in coach Smith's first season in 1980. A late Iowa field goal in the fourth quarter decided the game, and led to an Arizona loss.

UCLA

Arizona visited UCLA and played at the Rose Bowl for the first time ever (UCLA began playing home games here this season after decades playing at the Los Angeles Memorial Coliseum, sharing with USC). Both the Wildcats and Bruins fought tough and the game ultimately ended in a tie. The Bruins would go on to win the Pac-10 and play in the Rose Bowl at home.

Notre Dame

    
    
    
    
    
    
    

On the road at Notre Dame, the Wildcats and Irish battled back and forth and the game came down to the last play. With the score tied, Arizona got into Irish territory. Kicker Max Zendejas kicked a  48-yard field goal as time expired to win the game, and Smith and the Wildcats earned yet another win over a top-10 ranked team (Notre Dame was ranked ninth), as well as defeating the Irish for the first and only time in school history. To date, this remains the last time that both Arizona and Notre Dame would meet on the football field.

Similar to the 1981 win over USC, fans greeted the Wildcats with celebrations at the Tucson airport when they returned home hours after the game concluded.

USC

    
    
    
    
    
    
    
    
    
    
    
    
    
    
    

On homecoming weekend, the Wildcats hosted USC. Arizona had upset the Trojans in the previous year and were looking to make it two wins in a row against them. However, USC capitalized on the Wildcats’ mistakes throughout the game, including returning three interceptions for touchdowns, which set an NCAA record, and Arizona never recovered afterwards, despite rallying in the fourth quarter and ultimately coming up short as the Trojans held on for the win.

Arizona State

Going into the rivalry matchup against Arizona State, the Wildcats looked to spoil the Sun Devils’ chances for a possible Rose Bowl berth (ASU needed a win or tie against Arizona to punch their ticket to Pasadena). Arizona would blitz ASU all night, and the Wildcat defense recorded a pair of safeties and the offense connected on two long touchdown passes to help the Wildcats upset Arizona State and denied the Sun Devils a berth in the Rose Bowl. It was the Wildcats' first win over ASU at home since 1974 and the victory also began a reign of dominance against the Devils after being dominated by ASU throughout most of the previous two decades. After the game, fans rushed the field and tore down the Arizona Stadium goal posts by celebrating the Wildcats knocking their rivals out of the Rose Bowl. The win gave Arizona a sixth win of the year and became bowl-eligible. However, the Wildcats had self-imposed a bowl ban prior to the start of the season.

Awards and honors
 Ricky Hunley, LB, Consensus and AP All-American, First-team All-Pac-10

Season notes
 The Wildcats started a string of dominance over Arizona State this season, and went on to a 8–0–1 record against them, which was known as "The Streak" to fans, which lasted until 1991. This dominance lasted for the rest of Smith's tenure with the Wildcats, as he would not lose to ASU again, and it continued during the era under Smith's successor Dick Tomey that lasted through the 1990s.
 After defeating Notre Dame, the Wildcats and Fighting Irish have not met on the football field since. Arizona claimed that they couldn't afford scheduling non-conference games against tradition-rich powerhouse schools like Notre Dame due to it being too expensive for Arizona's athletic budget and a small market like Tucson. However, things would change in the future, as Arizona would play big opponents such as LSU (1984, 2003, 2006), Georgia (1985), Oklahoma (1988, 1989), Ohio State (1991, 1997, 2000), Miami (FL) (1991, 1992, 1993), Iowa (1998, 2009, 2010), Nebraska (1998, 2009, 2028, 2031), Penn State (1999), Wisconsin (2002, 2004), Purdue (2003, 2005, 2017), Oklahoma State (2010, 2011, 2012), Boston College (2013), Boise State (2014), Mississippi State (2022, 2023), Kansas State (2024, 2025), Virginia Tech (2029, 2030), and Alabama (2032, 2033).
 The Wildcats played at the Rose Bowl for the first time in its history (by playing a conference game against UCLA and not the actual bowl game itself, in which they have yet to appear in as of today).
 This was the third consecutive season in which Smith's Wildcats defeated a top ten opponent (UCLA in 1980, USC in 1981, and Notre Dame and Arizona State in 1982), and the only one to date where they won at least twice against the ranked teams. Arizona did tie UCLA, who was then ranked eighth.
 Arizona wore white jerseys in its home games against USC (lost) and ASU (won). Smith said that they wore white due to them winning big road games during the season, and the Wildcats joined LSU as one of the few college teams that wore white at home. The NCAA forced a rule that teams were required to wear colored jerseys at home beginning in the 1983 season. ASU, who wore their maroon home jerseys against Arizona, would not wear their home jerseys in Tucson again until 2020.
 By winning several games on the road during the season, Smith, as well as fans, referred to the team as “road warriors” (a reference to the film Mad Max 2: The Road Warrior that was released in America earlier in the year). The team's kicker, Max Zendejas, was often known as the team's true “road warrior” and “Mad Max” after kicking the winning field goal against Notre Dame, also referencing the film. The tie against UCLA and the loss at Oregon were the only two road games that the Wildcats failed to win all season.
 After the victory over ASU, many Wildcat players and fans claimed to have found roses that were either destroyed or tossed in trash cans around Arizona Stadium left behind by ASU fans. This was due to ASU needing a win over the Wildcats to clinch a Rose Bowl berth, and Arizona winning that prevented their rival from accomplishing that goal.
 Days after Arizona's upset of ASU, the Arizona Daily Wildcat (the university's newspaper), published an article of the game and featured a fan-made picture of Wilbur the Wildcat (Arizona’s mascot) defeating its ASU counterpart (Sparky the Sun Devil) with Wilbur standing in victory raising a helmet and carrying a football, while Sparky was lying on the ground covered in blood in defeat along with Sparky’s pitchfork split in two (implied to be broken by Wilbur) and pieces of roses scattered across the Arizona desert, referencing the Wildcats’ win over the Sun Devils.
 Despite the Wildcats winning six games during the season, they did not play in the postseason due to them self-imposing a bowl ban as a result of an NCAA investigation of fraud within the program (see above). Arizona was worried about losing bowl-eligibility due to the scandal and that they would be soon penalized, which led to the self-imposed ban.
 Fans have believed that the 1982 season began a resurgence that turned the Wildcats into contenders despite a tough schedule, and made headlines as a result. One article was posted at the end of the season about Arizona’s successful season while referencing memorable films released during the year, such as “having E.T.” in the Arizona Stadium crowd to cheer them”, a “Road Warrior kicking a winning field goal”, “haunted by a Poltergeist” after losses, and “going the distance like Rocky” after wins.

References

Arizona
Arizona Wildcats football seasons
Arizona Wildcats football